The 2008 Nagoya Grampus season was Nagoya Grampus' 15th season in the J. League Division 1 and 26th overall in the Japanese top flight. They also participated in the 2007 J. League Cup, being knocked out at the Group Stage, and the 2008 Emperor's Cup, where they reached the Fifth Round before defeat to Honda F.C.

Squad

Transfers

Winter

In:

Out:

Summer

In:

Out:

Competitions

J. League

Results

Table

Emperor's Cup

J. League Cup

Group stage

Player statistics

Appearances

Goal Scorers

Other pages
 J. League official site

References

Nagoya Grampus Eight
Nagoya Grampus seasons